MMTS Kwidzyn is a men's handball club from Kwidzyn, Poland, that plays in the Superliga.

Titles

Domestic 

Superliga :
  2nd: 2010
  3rd: 2009, 2011, 2013

International 

EHF Challenge Cup :
  2nd: 2010

Team

Current squad 
Squad for the 2022–23 season

Goalkeepers
 12  Oliwier Chruściel
 16  Bartosz Dudek
 33  Łukasz Zakreta
 39  Jakub Matlęga

Left wingers
2  Patryk Grzenkowicz
 11  Kacper Majewski
Right wingers
5  Artur Ekstowicz
 21  Jakub Szyszko
Line players 
8  Michał Peret
 25  Ryszard Landzwojczak
 77  Wiktor Jankowski

Left backs
1  Hubert Kornecki
9  Robert Kamyszek
 22  Filip Jarosz
Centre backs
 10  Nikodem Kutyła
 17  Filip Wawrzyniak
 19  Michał Potoczny
Right backs
3  Robert Orzechowski
 15  Alan Guziewicz
 20  Bartosz Nastaj

Transfers
Transfers for the 2022–23 season

 Joining
  Oliwier Chruściel (GK) (from  SMS Kwidzyn)
  Łukasz Zakreta (GK) (from  Energa MKS Kalisz)
  Filip Jarosz (LB) (from  SMS Kielce)
  Robert Kamyszek (LB) (from  Energa MKS Kalisz)
  Michał Potoczny (CB) (from  Kristiansand Topphåndball)
  Filip Wawrzyniak (CB) (from  SMS Kielce)

 Leaving
  Krzysztof Szczecina (GK) (to  Energa MKS Kalisz)
  Kamil Krieger (LB) (to ?)
  Jędrzej Zieniewicz (LB) (to  Energa MKS Kalisz)
  Arkadiusz Ossowski (CB) (to  HSC 2000 Coburg)

References

External links
Official website 

Polish handball clubs
Sport in Pomeranian Voivodeship
Handball clubs established in 1998
1998 establishments in Poland
Kwidzyn County